Christian August Christensen (6 August 1876 in Copenhagen – 5 December 1956 in Søllerød) was a Danish book printer and track and field athlete. He competed at the 1900 Summer Olympics in Paris, France. He was a member of Københavns Idræts Forening and served as the club's president from 1903-1905 and from 1916-1918.

Sports career
He took fifth place in the single-round final of the 1500 metres.  His time is unknown.

Christensen also competed in the 800 metres.  He placed fifth in his first-round (semifinals) heat and did not advance to the final.

References

External links

 

1876 births
1956 deaths
Athletes (track and field) at the 1900 Summer Olympics
Olympic athletes of Denmark
Danish male middle-distance runners
Athletes from Copenhagen
20th-century Danish people